Little Women: NY is an American reality television series that debuted on Lifetime on March 25, 2015, and concluded on June 15, 2016. It is the first spin-off series of Little Women: LA, except the series chronicles the life of a group of little women living in New York City. The second season of Little Woman: NY premiered on May 4, 2016, with Jessica Capri and Katie Snyder replacing Misty Irwin, Jordanna James, and Kristin Zettlemoyer. Regardless of the title, both seasons featured male cast member Jason Perez.

Episodes

Series overview

Season 1 (2015)

Season 2 (2016)

References

External links
 
 
 

2010s American reality television series
2015 American television series debuts
2016 American television series endings
English-language television shows
Lifetime (TV network) original programming
Little Women: LA
Television shows set in New York (state)
American television spin-offs
Reality television spin-offs
Television shows about dwarfism
Women in New York City